is the Cabinet-ordered romanization system for transcribing the Japanese language into the Latin alphabet. Its name is rendered Kunreisiki rômazi in the system itself. Kunrei-shiki is sometimes known as the Monbushō system in English because it is taught in the Monbushō-approved elementary school curriculum. The ISO has standardized Kunrei-shiki, under ISO 3602.

Kunrei-shiki is based on the older Nihon-shiki romanization, which was modified for modern standard Japanese. For example, the word かなづかい, romanized kanadukai in Nihon-shiki, is pronounced kanazukai in standard modern Japanese and is romanized as such in Kunrei-shiki. The system competes with the older Hepburn romanization system, which was promoted by the SCAP during the Allied occupation of Japan, after World War II.

History 
Before World War II, there was a political conflict between supporters of Hepburn romanisation and supporters of the Nihon-shiki romanisation. In 1930, a board of inquiry, under the aegis of the Minister of Education, was established to determine the proper romanization system. The military increased its control over the civilian government in the Empire of Japan following the February 26 Incident in 1936, and this nationalistic, militaristic government, by cabinet order (訓令 kunrei), announced on 21 September 1937 that a modified form of Nihon-shiki would be officially adopted as Kunrei-shiki. The form at the time differs slightly from the modern form. Originally, the system was called the Kokutei (国定, government-authorized) system.

The Japanese military-controlled government gradually introduced Kunrei-shiki, which appeared in secondary education, on railway station signboards, on nautical charts, and on the 1:1,000,000 scale International Map of the World. The military government, which had already led the Empire into the Second Sino-Japanese War and World War II, continued to control romanization of the language, such as using Kunrei-shiki in its tourist brochures. In Japan, some use of Nihon-shiki and Modified Hepburn remained, because some individuals supported the use of those systems.

After the imperialistic Japanese government was defeated in 1945, General Douglas MacArthur, the Supreme Commander for the Allied Powers (SCAP), issued a directive, dated 3 September 1945, that stated that Modified Hepburn was the method to transcribe Japanese names. Some editorials printed in Japanese newspapers advocated for using only Hepburn. Supporters of Hepburn denounced pro-Kunrei-shiki and pro-Nihon-shiki advocates to the SCAP offices by accusing them of being inactive militarists and of collaborating with militarists. Unger said that the nature of Kunrei-shiki led to "pent-up anger" by Hepburn supporters. During the postwar period, several educators and scholars tried to introduce romanized letters as a teaching device and possibility later replacing kanji. However, Kunrei-shiki had associations with Japanese militarism, and the US occupation was reluctant to promote it. On 9 December 1954, the Japanese government re-confirmed Kunrei-shiki as its official system but with slight modifications. Eleanor Jorden, an American linguist, made textbooks with a modified version of Kunrei-shiki, which were used in the 1960s in courses given to US diplomats. The use of her books did not change the US government's hesitation to use Kunrei-shiki.

As of 1974, according to the Geographical Survey Institute (now the Geospatial Information Authority of Japan), Kunrei-shiki was used for topographical maps, and Modified Hepburn was used for geological maps and aeronautical charts.

As of 1978, the National Diet Library used Kunrei-shiki. The Ministry of Foreign Affairs, the Ministry of International Trade and Industry, and many other official organizations instead used Hepburn, as did The Japan Times, the JTB Corporation, and many other private organisations.

Legal status 
The system was originally promulgated as Japanese Cabinet Order No. 3 as of 21 September 1937. Since it had been overturned by the SCAP during the occupation of Japan, the Japanese government repealed it and decreed again, as Japanese Cabinet Order No.1 as of 29 December 1954. It mandated the use of Kunrei-shiki in "the written expression of Japanese generally". Specific alternative spellings could be used in international relations and to follow established precedent. See Permitted Exceptions for details.

Kunrei-shiki has been recognised, along with Nihon-shiki, in ISO 3602:1989. Documentation—Romanisation of Japanese (kana script) by the ISO. It was also recommended by the ANSI after it withdrew its own standard, ANSI Z39.11-1972 American National Standard System for the Romanization of Japanese (Modified Hepburn), in 1994.

Usage 

Despite its official recognition, Japanese commonly choose between Nihon-shiki/Kunrei-shiki and Hepburn for any given situation. However, the Japanese government generally uses Hepburn, especially for passports, road signage, and train signage. Most Western publications, as well, and all English-language newspapers use some form of Hepburn.

J. Marshall Unger, the author of Literacy and Script Reform in Occupation Japan: Reading between the Lines, said that the Hepburn supporters "understandably" believed that the Kunrei-shiki "compromise" was not fair because of the presence of the "un-English-looking spellings" that the Modified Hepburn supporters had opposed. Andrew Horvat, the author of Japanese Beyond Words: How to Walk and Talk Like a Native Speaker, argued that "by forcing non-native speakers of Japanese with no intentions of learning the language to abide by a system intended for those who have some command of Japanese, the government gave the impression of intolerant language management that would have dire consequences later on." Because Kunrei-shiki is based on Japanese phonology rather than the actual phonetic realization, it can cause non-native speakers to pronounce words incorrectly. John Hinds, the author of Japanese: Descriptive Grammar, describes that as "a major disadvantage." It must be noted, however, that words written with Hepburn system are often pronounced incorrectly as well; for example, while English has the [i] sound of Japanese, in English it is rarely written as 'i', which creates the impression that 'i' is supposed to represent [ɪ] — thus [çiɾa̠ɡa̠na̠] became [hɪɹəɡænə] in English instead of [hiɹəɡænə]. Moreover, whereas Hepburn romanization is English-centric and thus of little to no help for speakers of languages other than English, Kunrei-shiki avoids this problem by not accommodating itself to the orthographic standards of any particular language in the first place and instead only taking into account the morphology of the language it was meant to represent.

Additional complications appear with newer kana combinations such as ティーム (チーム) team. In Hepburn, they would be distinguished as different sounds and represented as tīmu and chīmu respectively. That gives better indications of the English pronunciations. For some Japanese-speakers, however, the sounds ティ "ti" and チ "chi" are the same phoneme; both are represented in Kunrei-shiki as tîmu. Such complications may be confusing to those who do not know Japanese phonology well. Use of an apostrophe (t'îmu), not unseen in Wāpuro rōmaji, may be a possible solution.

Today, the main users of Kunrei-shiki are native speakers of Japanese, especially within Japan, and linguists studying Japanese. The main advantage of Kunrei-shiki is that it is better able to illustrate Japanese grammar, as Hepburn gives the impression of certain conjugations being irregular (see table, right). The most serious problem of Hepburn in this context is that it may change the stem of a verb, which is not reflected in the underlying morphology of the language. One notable introductory textbook for English-speakers, Eleanor Jorden's Japanese: The Spoken Language, uses her JSL romanization, a system strongly influenced by Kunrei-shiki in its adherence to Japanese phonology, but it is adapted to teaching proper pronunciation of Japanese phonemes.

Kunrei-shiki spellings of kana

Notes
 Characters in red are obsolete in modern Japanese.
 When he (へ) is used as a particle, it is written as e, not he (as in Nihon-shiki).
 When ha (は) is used as a particle, it is written as wa, not ha.
 wo (を/ヲ) is used only as a particle, written o.
 Long vowels are indicated by a circumflex accent: long o is written ô.
 Vowels that are separated by a morpheme boundary are not considered to be a long vowel. For example, おもう (思う) is written omou, not omô.
 Syllabic n (ん) is written as n''' before vowels and y but as n before consonants and at the end of a word.
 Geminate consonants are always marked by doubling the consonant following the sokuon (っ).
 The first letter in a sentence and all proper nouns are capitalized.
 ISO 3602 has the strict form; see Nihon-shiki.

 Permitted exceptions 
The Cabinet Order makes an exception to the above chart:
 In international relations and situations for which prior precedent would make a sudden reform difficult, the spelling given by Chart 2 may also be used:

The exceptional clause is not to be confused with other systems of romanization (such as Hepburn) and does not specifically relax other requirements, such as marking long vowels.

 See also 

 List of ISO transliterations

 Sources 
 Geographical Survey Institute (Kokudo Chiriin). Bulletin of the Geographical Survey Institute, Volumes 20-23. 1974.
 Gottlieb, Nanette. "The Rōmaji movement in Japan." Journal of the Royal Asiatic Society (Third Series). January 2010. Volume 20, Issue 1. p. 75-88. Published online on November 30, 2009. Available at Cambridge Journals. DOI doi:10.1017/S1356186309990320.
 Hadamitzky, Wolfgang. Kanji & Kana Revised Edition (漢字・かな). Tuttle Publishing, 1997. , 9780804820776.
 Horvat, Andrew. Japanese Beyond Words: How to Walk and Talk Like a Native Speaker. Stone Bridge Press, 2000. , 9781880656426.
 Hinds, John. Japanese: Descriptive Grammar. Taylor & Francis Group, 1986. , 9780415010337.
 Kent, Allen, Harold Lancour, and Jay Elwood Daily (Executive Editors). Encyclopedia of Library and Information Science Volume 21. CRC Press, April 1, 1978. , 9780824720216.
 Unger, J. Marshall. Literacy and Script Reform in Occupation Japan : Reading between the Lines: Reading between the Lines. Oxford University Press. July 8, 1996. , 9780195356380.
 

 References 

 External links 
 Horvat, Andrew. "The Romaji (Roomaji) Conundrum." (Archive) – Excerpt from Horvat's book: Japanese Beyond Words: How to Walk and Talk Like a Native Speaker''. Hosted at the David See-Chai Lam Centre for International Communication of Simon Fraser University.

Romanization of Japanese
ISO 3602
Japanese writing system